Convatec Group plc is a medical products and technologies company based in Reading, Berkshire, England. offering products and services in the areas of wound and skin care, ostomy care, continence and critical care and infusion devices. It is listed on the London Stock Exchange and is a constituent of the FTSE 100 Index.

History
The company was established as a division of E.R. Squibb & Sons, Inc. in 1978 and acquired by Nordic Capital and Avista Capital Partners in 2008. In 2008 merged with Unomedical (with headquarters in Denmark), a manufacturer of single-use medical devices,
and 180 Medical, a catheter manufacturer, in 2012.

In June 2015 the company won a Court of Appeal ruling that determined that in the context of a patent "between 1% and 25%" should be interpreted rounding to the nearest 1%, so that an attempt to circumvent a patent by using the value 0.9% failed. In October 2016 the company was valued at £4.4bn in the largest initial public offering on the London Stock Exchange in the year.

On 15 October 2018, Convatec announced that Paul Moraviec would be retiring as CEO with immediate effect, and would be succeeded on an interim basis by non-executive director Rick Anderson, who was formerly the chairman of Johnson & Johnson.

On 25 March 2019, Convatec announced Karim Bitar, formerly CEO of Genus Plc, had been appointed CEO and would join the business on 30 September 2019.

On 19 August 2019, Convatec announced Dr John McAdam CBE would become Chairman, effective 30 September, the same day Karim Bitar became CEO.

Operations
The company has 9,000 employees and operates in more than 100 countries.

References

External links

Medical equipment
Health care companies established in 1978
1978 establishments in England
Companies based in Reading, Berkshire
Companies listed on the London Stock Exchange
Medical technology companies of the United Kingdom